Prayag Junction railway station (station code: PRG) is an important railway station in Allahabad district, Uttar Pradesh. It serves Prayag town in Allahabad (Prayagraj). It consists of three platforms. The NR is developing the neighbouring Prayagraj sangam station as a coaching terminal. It is designed by architect M K Singh in the year 2018. There will be five new platforms, two washing lines, and a new station building with basement.

Trains 

Some of the trains that runs from Prayag Junction are:

 Bundelkhand Express
 Unchahar Express
 Saryu Express
 Prayagraj sangam–Kanpur Intercity Express
 Prayagraj sangam–Haridwar Express
 Prayagraj sangam–Lucknow Intercity Express
 Ganga Gomti Express
 Prayagraj sangam–Bareilly Express
 Triveni Express
 Nauchandi Express
 Kashi Express
 Sarnath Express

 Manwar Sangam Express
 Saryu Express
 Shaktinagar Terminal–Tanakpur Express
 Prayagraj sangam–Jaunpur Passenger
Prayagraj sangam - Ghazipur city DEMU Express

See also

References

External links 

 PRG/Prayag Junction 

Railway junction stations in Uttar Pradesh
Lucknow NR railway division
Railway stations in Allahabad